A gift or a present is an item given to someone without the expectation of payment or anything in return. An item is not a gift if that item is already owned by the one to whom it is given. Although gift-giving might involve an expectation of reciprocity, a gift is meant to be free. In many countries, the act of mutually exchanging money, goods, etc. may sustain social relations and contribute to social cohesion. Economists have elaborated the economics of gift-giving into the notion of a gift economy. By extension the term gift can refer to any item or act of service that makes the other happier or less sad, especially as a favor, including forgiveness and kindness. Gifts are also first and foremost presented on occasions such as birthdays and holidays.

Presentation 
In many cultures gifts are traditionally packaged in some way. For example, in Western cultures, gifts are often wrapped in wrapping paper and accompanied by a gift note which may note the occasion, the recipient's name and the giver's name. In Chinese culture, red wrapping connotes luck. Although inexpensive gifts are common among colleagues, associates and acquaintances, expensive or amorous gifts are considered more appropriate among close friends, romantic interests or relatives.

Gift-giving occasions  
Gift-giving occasions may be:
  
 An expression of love or friendship
 An expression of gratitude for a gift received.
 An expression of piety, in the form of charity.
 An expression of solidarity, in the form of mutual aid.
 To share wealth.
 To offset misfortune.
 Offering travel souvenirs.
 Custom, on occasions (often celebrations) such as
 A birthday (the person who has his or her birthday gives cake, etc. and/or receives gifts).
 A potlatch, in societies where status is associated with gift-giving rather than acquisition.
 Christmas (throughout the history of Christmas gift giving, people have given one another gifts, often pretending they are left by Santa Claus, the Christ Child or Saint Nicholas).
 Feast of Saint Nicholas (people give each other gifts, often supposedly receiving them from Saint Nicholas).
 Easter baskets with chocolate eggs, jelly beans, and chocolate rabbits are gifts given on Easter.
 Greek Orthodox Christians in Greece, will give gifts to family and friends on the Feast of Saint Basil.
 Muslims give gifts to family and friends, known as Eidi, on Eid al-Fitr (the end of Ramadan) and on Eid al-Adha.
 American Jews give Hanukkah gifts to family and friends.
 Hindus give Diwali and Pongal gifts to family and friends. Rakhi or Raksha Bandhan is another occasion where brothers give gifts to sisters. 
 Buddhists give Vesak gifts to family and friends.
 Gifts are given to among African American families and friends on Kwanzaa.
 A wedding (the couple receives gifts and gives food and/or drinks at the wedding reception).
 A wedding anniversary (each spouse receives gifts).
 A funeral (visitors bring flowers, the relatives of the deceased give food and/or drinks after the ceremonial part).
 A birth (the baby receives gifts, or the mother receives a gift from the father known as a push present).
 Passing an examination (the student receives gifts).
 Father's Day (the father receives gifts).
 Mother's Day (the mother receives gifts).
 Siblings Day (the sibling receives gifts)
 Exchange of gifts between a guest and a host, often a traditional practice.
 Lagniappe
 Retirement Gifts
 Congratulations Gifts
 Engagement Gifts
 Housewarming party Gifts
 Women's day Gifts
Valentine's Day

Promotional gifts 
Promotional gifts vary from the normal gifts. The recipients of the gifts may be either employee of a company or the clients. Promotional gifts are mainly used for advertising purposes. They are used to promote the brand name and increase its awareness among the people. In promotional gifting procedures, the quality and presentation of the gifts hold more value than the gifts itself since it will act as a gateway to acquire new clients or associates.

As reinforcement and manipulation 
Giving a gift to someone is not necessarily just an altruistic act. It may be given in the hope that the receiver reciprocates in a particular way. It may take the form of positive reinforcement as a reward for compliance, possibly for an underhand manipulative and abusive purpose.

Unwanted gifts

A significant fraction of gifts are unwanted, or the giver pays more for the item than the recipient values it, resulting in a misallocation of economic resources known as a deadweight loss. Unwanted gifts are often "regifted", donated to charity, or thrown away. A gift that actually imposes a burden on the recipient, either due to maintenance or storage or disposal costs, is known as a white elephant.

One cause of the mismatch between the giver's and receiver's view is that the giver is focused on the act of giving the gift, while the receiver is more interested in the long-term utilitarian value of the gift.  For example, many receivers prefer a future experience instead of an object, or a practical gift that they have requested over a more expensive, showier gift chosen by the giver.

One means of reducing the mismatch between the buyer and receivers' tastes is advance coordination, often undertaken in the form of a wedding registry or Christmas list. Wedding registries in particular are often kept at a single store, which can designate the exact items to be purchased (resulting in matching housewares), and to coordinate purchases so the same gift is not purchased by different guests. One study found that wedding guests who departed from the registry typically did so because they wished to signal a closer relationship to the couple by personalizing a gift, and also found that as a result of not abiding by the recipients' preferences, their gifts were appreciated less often.

An estimated $3.4 billion was spent on unwanted Christmas gifts in the United States in 2017. The day after Christmas is typically the busiest day for returns in countries with large Christmas gift giving traditions. The total unredeemed value of gift cards purchased in the U.S. each year is estimated to be about a billion dollars.

In some cases, people know the preferences of recipients very well, and can give highly valued gifts. Some value in gift-giving comes from assisted preference discovery - people receiving gifts they did not know they would like, or which they did not know were available. Behavioral economists propose that the non-material value of gifts lies in strengthening relationships by signalling the giver was thoughtful, or spent time and effort on the gift.

Legal aspects 

At common law, for a gift to have legal effect, it was required that there be (1) intent by the donor to give a gift, and (2) delivery to the recipient of the item to be given as a gift. 

In some countries, certain types of gifts above a certain monetary amount are subject to taxation. For the United States, see Gift tax in the United States.

In some contexts, gift giving can be construed as bribery. This tends to occur in situations where the gift is given with an implicit or explicit agreement between the giver of the gift and its receiver that some type of service will be rendered (often outside of normal legitimate methods) because of the gift. Some groups, such as government workers, may have strict rules concerning gift giving and receiving so as to avoid the appearance of impropriety.

Cross border monetary gifts are subject to taxation in both source and destination countries based on the treaty between the two countries.

Religious views 
Lewis Hyde claims in The Gift that Christianity considers the Incarnation and subsequent death of Jesus to be the greatest gift to humankind, and that the Jataka contains a tale of the Buddha in his incarnation as the Wise Hare giving the ultimate alms by offering himself up as a meal for Sakka. (Hyde, 1983, 58-60)

In the Eastern Orthodox Church, the bread and wine that are consecrated during the Divine Liturgy are referred to as "the Gifts." They are first of all the gifts of the community (both individually and corporately) to God, and then, after the epiklesis, the Gifts of the Body and Blood of Christ to the Church.

Ritual sacrifices can be seen as return gifts to a deity.

See also

References

Further reading

 Marcel Mauss and W.D. Halls, Gift: The Form and Reason for Exchange in Archaic Societies, W. W. Norton, 2000, trade paperback, 
 Lewis Hyde: The Gift: Imagination and the Erotic Life of Property, 1983, especially part I, "A Theory of Gifts", part of which was originally published as "The Gift Must Always Move" in Co-Evolution Quarterly No. 35, Fall 1982.
 Jean-Luc Marion translated by Jeffrey L. Kosky, "Being Given: Toward a Phenomenology of Giveness", Stanford University Press, 2002 by the Board of Trustees of the Leland Stanford Junior University, (cloth : alk. paper) .
 Suzie Gibson: "Give and take: the anxiety of gift giving at Christmas," The Conversation, 16 December 2014.
  Alain Testart, Critique du don : Études sur la circulation non marchande, Paris, Collection Matériologique, éd. Syllepse, 268 p., 2007
 Review of the "World of the Gift"
 Antón, C., Camarero, C. and Gil, F. (2014), The culture of gift giving: What do consumers expect from commercial and personal contexts? Journal of Consumer Behaviour, 13: 31–41. doi: 10.1002/cb.1452
 

 
Social influence
Simple living